Caltoris cahira austeni, the Austen's swift, is a species of skipper butterfly found in Asia.

Description

It is found in the Khasi Hills, Sikkim and Cherrapunji.

References

Caltoris
Butterflies of Asia